West Suffolk is a constituency represented in the House of Commons of the UK Parliament since 2010 by Matt Hancock, originally elected as a Conservative but who sits as an Independent following his suspension in November 2022.  Between 1832 and 1885 there had also been a constituency, the Western Division of Suffolk that had also been called West Suffolk.

History

Between the 1832 Reform Act and 1885 there had been a constituency, the Western Division of Suffolk, also known as West Suffolk, although on different boundaries. Its second creation occurred with Parliamentary approval of the Boundary Commission's fourth periodic review of Westminster constituencies in time for the 1997 general election.

Political history
The seat at this time has only been represented by Conservatives with the narrowest majority having been that of 1997 at only 3.8% of the vote, since which the majority has gradually increased to a level seen most commonly in safe seats.

For the 2010 general election, the transition was planned six months before, on 23 November 2009, when the incumbent announced he would not stand again.

Prominent frontbenchers
Richard Spring was an opposition spokesman for Foreign Affairs (2000-2004) (shadowing a Foreign and Commonwealth Office Minister) then Shadow Minister for the Treasury (2004-2005) before being a vice-chairman of his party and being elevated to the House of Lords as Lord Risby. Several of his ancestors had previously represented Suffolk in the House of Commons.

Matt Hancock was a government minister serving under various positions from 2012 until the 2015 general election, when he was promoted to the Cabinet as Paymaster General and Minister for the Cabinet Office. After a short stint outside the Cabinet between 2016 and 2018 as a minister at the Department for Digital, Culture, Media and Sport, he rejoined the Cabinet as Secretary of State for Digital, Culture, Media and Sport and was promoted in July 2018 to serve as Secretary of State for Health and Social Care, serving until 2021 when he resigned from this position following an affair with his aide Gina Coladangelo, which at the time breached COVID-19 social distancing rules.

Constituency profile 
This area includes a slightly older demographic profile than the national average, with a significant proportion of semi-detached and detached homes and a higher than average proportion of retired people.

Major economic sectors include defence (RAF Mildenhall and RAF Lakenheath), agriculture/food (including for major products as well as regional specialities such as ales, Suffolk cider and cured meats), tourism and leisure (such as Newmarket racecourse) and particularly in Haverhill, a range of industries.  These include chemicals (such as International Flavors and Fragrances), waste processing, transport, construction and pharmaceuticals.

Workless claimants who were registered jobseekers were in November 2012 lower than the national average of 3.8%, at 2.5% of the population based on a statistical compilation by The Guardian.

Boundaries and boundary changes 

1832–1885: The Liberty of Bury St. Edmund's, and the Hundreds of Hartesmere, and Stow.

1997–2010: The District of Forest Heath, and the Borough of St Edmundsbury wards of Barningham, Barrow, Cangle, Castle, Chalkstone, Chevington, Clements, Honington, Horringer, Hundon, Ixworth, Kedington, Risby, St Mary's and Helions, Stanton, Wickhambrook, and Withersfield.

The new county constituency was formed primarily from the majority (including Newmarket) of the constituency of Bury St Edmunds, which was reconfigured. It also incorporated westernmost areas of South Suffolk, including Haverhill.

2010–present: The District of Forest Heath, and the Borough of St Edmundsbury wards of Bardwell, Barningham, Barrow, Chedburgh, Haverhill East, Haverhill North, Haverhill South, Haverhill West, Hundon, Ixworth, Kedington, Risby, Stanton, Wickhambrook, and Withersfield.

Marginal changes due to revision of local authority wards.

The constituency includes the town of Newmarket, the world headquarters of horse racing, as well as the towns of Haverhill and Mildenhall, with a farmed landscape, interspersed with patches of forest and small villages.

Members of Parliament

Elections

Elections in the 2010s

Elections in the 2000s

Elections in the 1990s

See also 
 List of parliamentary constituencies in Suffolk

Notes

References

Parliamentary constituencies in Suffolk
Constituencies of the Parliament of the United Kingdom established in 1997
Matt Hancock